Pilliya was a king of Kizzuwatna ca. the 15th century BC (short chronology). He signed a treaty with Idrimi of Alalakh, allying with the Mitanni empire. 

He made peace with Zidanta II.

Notes

Kings of Kizzuwatna
15th-century BC rulers